Edward Leedskalnin (January 12, 1887 – December 7, 1951) was a Latvian immigrant to the United States and self-taught engineer who single-handedly built the Coral Castle in Florida, added to the National Register of Historic Places in 1984. Leedskalnin was also known for developing theories of magnetism.

Life
Edward Leedskalnin was born on January 12, 1887, in Stāmeriena Parish, Latvia. He was the fifth son of Mini and Andrejs, who were farmers on rented land. It's during his time in Latvia that it's believed under the tutelage of his father that Leedskalnin learned stonemasonry. Little is known of his childhood, aside from the fact that his parents were not wealthy and he received only a fourth-grade formal education. Edward was a sickly boy who often spent time reading books, helping him to develop an inquisitive mind and life-long yearning for knowledge. It was suggested that he learned stonemasonry from his father and practiced this craft in Latvia after coming of age.

At the age of 26 he was engaged to marry Agnes Skuvst who was ten years younger. However, the girl who Leedskalnin later referred to as his "Sweet Sixteen" broke their engagement. He then decided to emigrate to North America.

On April 7, 1912, Leedskalnin arrived in New York City. After looking for suitable work around the East Coast until August, he relocated to the Pacific Northwest, which was experiencing a logging boom. On June 5, 1917, while in Oregon he filled in his draft registration stating that he was self-employed and engaged in ax-handle manufacturing. The 1920 census data reveal that he resided in Reedsport, Oregon.

In the winter of 1922–1923, after allegedly contracting tuberculosis, Leedskalnin moved to the warmer climate of Florida, where he purchased an undeveloped parcel of land in Florida City, which at the time was lightly inhabited. On February 27, 1923 The Homestead Enterprise newspaper published a notice that "E. Leedskalnin a Californian has purchased an acre of the R. L. Moser homestead and is planning to erect a home soon."

Over the next 20 years, Leedskalnin constructed a massive structure that he called "Rock Gate" and dedicated, in his own words, to the girl who had left him years before. Working alone and mostly at night, Leedskalnin eventually quarried and sculpted more than 1,100 short tons (997,903 kg) of oolite limestone into an architectural and engineering landmark that would later be known as the Coral Castle. He used various basic tools available under his modest means including salvaged timber and old automobile parts. First, he built a house out of limestone blocks and wood, then he gradually constructed the stone structure for which he is now famous. With a reserved personality, he eventually opened the Coral Castle to the public, offering tours for 10 cents.

When people were asking Leedskalnin how he had moved all of the heavy stone on his own, he usually replied, "I understand the laws of weight and leverage and I know the secrets of the people who built the pyramids", referring to the Great Pyramid of Giza. Some local residents later remembered that as school children they had field trips to the construction site of the future Coral Castle, and Leedskalnin personally explained manual methods of his work.

In the 1920s, the structure with an assortment of sculpted stones was located in Florida City; then, in the mid-1930s, Leedskalnin hired a truck with a driver to move it to its present location on a  site in the adjacent Homestead, Florida. Leedskalnin was an eccentric and lived on an exclusive diet of only crackers and sardines. In his later years, he starved himself. On November 9, 1951, he checked himself into Jackson Memorial Hospital in Miami. Apparently, Leedskalnin suffered a stroke either before he left for the hospital or at the hospital. He died twenty-eight days later of pyelonephritis (kidney infection) at the age of 64. His death certificate noted that his death was a result of "uremia; failure of kidneys, as a result of the infection and abscess."

Publications
Leedskalnin published five pamphlets on various subjects, advertising them in local newspapers.

Magnetic Current was first published in 1988 and the only source for any of these pamphlets is the Coral Castle gift shop.

Moral education
His first and longest booklet, a treatise on moral education, is printed on only the left-hand pages, and begins with the following preface:

In the first section, Leedskalnin argues that girls should be kept pure, and that boys are primarily a soiling influence upon them. On page 4 of A Book in Every Home, Leedskalnin writes:

The second section continues along the theme of moral education, with several aphorisms aimed at parents regarding the proper way to raise children. The last, "Political" section, reveals that the reclusive Leedskalnin had strong political views. He advocates voting for property owners only (and in proportion to their holdings), and argues that "Anyone who is too weak to make his own living is not strong enough to vote."

Some writers have suggested that Leedskalnin's booklet contains further information on his electromagnetic research and philosophies encoded in its pages, and the blank pages are provided for the reader to fill in their decrypted solutions. It has also been suggested that Leedskalnin's frequent referral to his "Sweet Sixteen" may in fact refer to the numerological and/or scientific relevance of the number sixteen to his research and theories.

He wrote that a mother's most important task is to ensure that her daughter remains "chaste and faithful":

Magnetism
Leedskalnin became interested in the general theory of magnetism. His four pamphlets addressed interaction of electricity, magnetism and the body; Leedskalnin also included a number of simple experiments to validate his theories.

Contradicting the standard model of electromagnetism, but remarkably in line with the concept of 'magnetic moment' / 'electron spin theory', his thesis is based upon the theory that the metal itself is not the magnet and that the real magnets are circulating in the metal. These individual north and south pole magnets are particles smaller than atoms or photons and each particle in the substance was an individual magnet by itself.

Leedskalnin claimed that all matter was being acted upon by what he called "individual magnets". He also claimed that scientists of his time were looking in the wrong place for their understanding of electricity and that they were observing only "one half of the whole concept" with "one sided tools of measurement"

In popular culture
Ed Leedskalnin and his megalithic creation of Coral Castle became a part of the American popular culture due to the magnitude of a single man's effort and ingenuity. Some conjectured that he used esoteric ancient knowledge to levitate blocks of stone and move them with the aid of the Earth's magnetic energy. Other explanations center on Leedskalnin's stonemasonry and logging experiences that allowed him to apply his work skills to a tedious process of moving large blocks of stone using levers, wheels, axles, pulleys, ramps, and wedges without any electrical equipment.

The emotional side of Ed Leedskalnin's life story drew the attention of authors, songwriters and performers, including:
 Billy Idol recorded the song "Sweet Sixteen" for his Whiplash Smile album. It was based on the love story of Leedskalnin and his runaway girl. The music video was recorded at Coral Castle in 1986.
 The Brooklyn-based band Piñataland recorded a song about Leedskalnin, titled "Latvian Bride", for their 2003 album Songs for the Forgotten Future Vol. 1.
 Andrew Peterson recorded a song, "The Coral Castle", in his Carried Along (2002) studio album that evoked Leedskalnin's broken heart story.
 Cuban-American author Daína Chaviano, dedicated a whole chapter ("Very close to my heart") from her novel The Island of Eternal Love to the history of Coral Castle and his builder Edward Leedskalnin

Bibliography

See also 
 Viktor Schauberger
 Simon Rodia
 Electromagnetic lock — about the "Magnetic Motion Holder" experiment of magnetic current

References

Further reading

 

Stavro, Andris. Koral̦l̦u pils: Edvarda Liedskalnin̦a Koral̦l̦u pils ir uzn̦emta Amerikas Savienoto Valstu Vēsturisko vietu nacionālajā reg̓istrā. Rīga: LA izdevniecība, 2005.

External links 
 Coral Castle Museum
 Compilation of the published writings of Edward Leedskalnin 
 David Carr, Independent Researcher and Writer,  Investigating Coral Castle, July 8, 2014.
 Ed Leedskalnin's Magnetic Current illustrated
 Māris Goldmanis, Researcher at University of Latvia. Edward Leedskalnin and his Coral Castle in Florida, Latvian History, January 11, 2014.

1887 births
1951 deaths
People from Gulbene Municipality
People from Kreis Walk
Latvian emigrants to the United States
Emigrants from the Russian Empire to the United States
American people of Latvian descent
20th-century American sculptors
20th-century Latvian artists
20th-century American male artists
American male sculptors
American stonemasons
Aphorists
Artists from Miami
Esotericists
Latvian sculptors
People from Reedsport, Oregon
Sculptors from Florida
Deaths from kidney failure
Deaths from uremia